Michael A. Fagg (born November 12, 1954) is an American politician in the Kansas Senate from the 14th district. He assumed office in 2021.

References

External links
 Michael Fagg at VoteSmart

Living people
1954 births
Republican Party Kansas state senators
21st-century American politicians
People from El Dorado, Kansas